Notruf Hafenkante is a German television series broadcast on ZDF. It is set in Hamburg and is about the members of the police department PK 21 and the doctors of the fictional hospital Elbkrankenhaus. The show's premise is modelled on the Davidwache police station, which historically worked closely with the Hamburg harbour hospital.

See also
 List of German television series

External links
 

2007 German television series debuts
2010s German television series
German crime television series
2000s German police procedural television series
2010s German police procedural television series
2020s German police procedural television series
German medical television series
Television shows set in Hamburg
German-language television shows
ZDF original programming